The 1947–48 Michigan Wolverines men's basketball team represented the University of Michigan in intercollegiate college basketball during the 1947–48 season.  The team played its home games at Yost Arena on the school's campus in Ann Arbor, Michigan.  The team won the Western Conference Championship. Under the direction of head coach Osborne Cowles, the team earned Michigan's first invitation to the NCAA Division I men's basketball tournament in 1948. The team was led the school's first two All-Big Nine honorees: Bob Harrison and Pete Elliott as well as the team's leading scorer Mack Suprunowicz. The team earned the Big Nine team statistical championships for both scoring defense (46.3) and scoring margin (7.6).  Harrison served as team captain and Elliott earned team MVP.

References

Michigan
Michigan Wolverines men's basketball seasons
Michigan Wolverines basketball
Michigan Wolverines basketball